Kevin Martinus Adrianus Brands (born 28 March 1988) is a Dutch professional footballer who plays as an attacking midfielder for OJC Rosmalen in Hoofdklasse B Sunday.

Club career
He played in the youth teams of RKC and FC Den Bosch and signed a contract with AZ in January 2009, where he was included in the reserve team, Jong AZ. AZ then loaned him to Telstar. He later played for Willem II and SC Cambuur in the Eredivisie and FC Volendam and NAC Breda in the Eerste Divisie.

Brands returned to play in the Eredivisie when he joined Go Ahead Eagles on a one-year contract in summer 2016. There, he was reunited with his head coach at Volendam, Hans de Koning. His contract included an option for another season. Although he began the season as a starter, he soon lost his spot in the starting lineup and was mainly a reserve during the rest of the fall of 2016. After half a year, he was allowed to leave the club. He was subsequently on trial at Dundee in Scotland, but a move never materialised. On 17 January 2017, he joined Turkish side Samsunspor, competing in the TFF 1. Lig, the second highest Turkish league. In August 2017, Brands began playing for Almere City. In December of that year, he had his contract terminated and subsequently signed a two-year deal with Bali United in Indonesia. Brands never made an appearance in the Indonesian league for the club, but did play five matches, including one qualifying match for the AFC Champions League and four matches in the group stage of the 2018 AFC Cup. His contract was cancelled in March 2018 by the Bali United board, because he did not fit the playing style of the team. At the beginning of September 2018, he had his contract terminated and he started playing for VVSB in the third-tier Dutch Tweede Divisie. He left there in December 2018. In January 2019, Brands moved to Thai club Lampang in the second-tier Thai League 2.

Personal life
Kevin is the son of former footballer and former director of football of Everton, Marcel Brands.

References

External links
 Voetbal International profile 

1988 births
Living people
People from Waalwijk
Association football midfielders
Dutch footballers
Eerste Divisie players
Eredivisie players
SC Telstar players
Willem II (football club) players
SC Cambuur players
FC Volendam players
NAC Breda players
Go Ahead Eagles players
Samsunspor footballers
Dutch expatriate footballers
Expatriate footballers in Turkey
Almere City FC players
Bali United F.C. players
Kevin Brands
Kevin Brands
Liga 1 (Indonesia) players
TFF First League players
Tweede Divisie players
Expatriate footballers in Indonesia
Expatriate footballers in Thailand
Dutch expatriate sportspeople in Turkey
Dutch expatriate sportspeople in Indonesia
Dutch expatriate sportspeople in Thailand
RKC Waalwijk players
FC Den Bosch players
VVSB players
Footballers from North Brabant